WOTV (channel 41) is a television station licensed to Battle Creek, Michigan, United States, serving West Michigan as an affiliate of ABC. It is owned by Nexstar Media Group alongside Grand Rapids–licensed NBC affiliate WOOD-TV (channel 8) and Class A MyNetworkTV affiliate WXSP-CD (channel 15). The stations share studios on College Avenue Southeast in Grand Rapids, while WOTV's transmitter is located on South Norris Road in Orangeville Township. WOTV brands itself as ABC 4 West Michigan, based on its channel 4 position on most area cable systems.

Channel 41's existence in Battle Creek is owed to the northerly location of the transmitter of Grand Rapids-based WZZM (channel 13), which signed on in 1962 as a late insertion into the market. Because WZZM's transmitter is north of Grand Rapids in Grant, its signal does not reach Battle Creek, Kalamazoo, and other areas in the southern portion of the market. A group of local businessmen known as Channel 41, Inc., won the construction permit for channel 41 in 1970 after a predecessor unsuccessfully tried to sell out to WZZM; WUHQ-TV signed on in 1971 from studios in the former headquarters building of Fort Custer and has been an ABC affiliate since it began, creating a rare split affiliation. The station's attempts at local news programming were low-rated and inconsistent, with many changes in timing and strategy.

After WZZM's owners could not close on an FCC-approved merger with Channel 41, Inc., in 1991, the company brokered the station's air time to channel 8, which began producing Battle Creek–Kalamazoo news inserts for air on the station. When channel 8 reclaimed the WOOD-TV call letters in 1992, WUHQ-TV became WOTV. This grew into a separate news operation that continued to exist until it was shut down in 2003, two years after WOOD-TV's then-owner, LIN Television, acquired the station outright. Since then, WOTV has offered ABC programming, a separate slate of syndicated programs, and WOOD-TV's local newscasts. Even though it attracts a fraction of the viewers of WZZM, it continues to provide better signal coverage in the market's southern tier.

The battle for ABC in southern West Michigan

In November 1962, West Michigan gained its third very high frequency (VHF) station when WZZM began broadcasting from Grand Rapids on channel 13 as an ABC affiliate. However, the drop-in of channel 13 to Grand Rapids, proposed in 1959 and accepted by the Federal Communications Commission (FCC) in 1961, came with a technical condition to ensure spacing to other TV stations. The station's transmitter had to be located north of the city, near Muskegon. This meant that the southern tier of the market—Kalamazoo and Battle Creek—was outside its coverage area. Initially, WZZM's owner, West Michigan Telecasters, sought to remedy the shortfall by building translators to repeat WZZM's signal in those two cities. The FCC approved the construction of channel 12 in Kalamazoo in 1964, and the next year, the group applied to activate a similar facility on the UHF band in Battle Creek.

That was not the only filing made to the FCC for a television facility in Battle Creek in 1965. At the same time, a partnership known as BCU-TV applied for a new full-service station in Battle Creek; partners included Mary Jane Morris and James Searer, who had once applied to own and been interim part-owner of WZZM, as well as supermarket executive Frederik Meijer. Channel 41 was substituted for 65 months later as part of changes to the FCC's UHF table of allocations. BCU-TV proposed to affiliate its station with ABC and suggested a studio site near Augusta. The FCC granted BCU-TV a construction permit on September 28, 1967.

An obstacle continued to loom between WZZM and BCU-TV, as the FCC also approved the construction of WZZM's channel 74 translator for Battle Creek. This created an issue because both stations proposed to bring ABC programming to the city. West Michigan Telecasters sued BCU-TV in Kent County circuit court, seeking $3 million in damages for infringing on what it alleged were its market rights to provide ABC programming throughout West Michigan. WZZM activated its Battle Creek translator in late January 1968, but after the FCC then rescinded its grant for the Battle Creek translator and the United States Court of Appeals for the District of Columbia Circuit refused to stay the ruling, West Michigan Telecasters was forced to shut it down in March, believing that the translator would be detrimental to the BCU-TV station's proposed operation.

On October 22, 1968, BCU-TV announced that it had agreed to sell the channel 41 permit, with the call sign WWWU-TV, to West Michigan Telecasters to be used as a satellite station of WZZM, as part of a transfer of stock arranged by Morris.

Channel 41, Inc. ownership
Three days later, a group of Kalamazoo and Battle Creek businessmen under the name Channel 41, Inc., announced that it would file for a construction permit of its own to build the station. While Morris began the process to dissolve the BCU-TV partnership, Searer had left to become executive vice president of the new Channel 41, Inc., having moved to sever ties as a result of the decision to sell to West Michigan Telecasters.

The FCC canceled the WWWU-TV construction permit and West Michigan Telecasters's attempt to buy it on September 8, 1969. It then accepted the application of Channel 41, Inc., for filing and gave BCU-TV and other parties 60 days to file. Ten days later, West Michigan Telecasters abandoned its attempt to pursue channel 41 in favor of seeking a relocation of its transmitter to the south. Channel 41, Inc., was the sole applicant for the permit, but the firm's plans continued to depend on whether ABC would grant an affiliation—and, thusly, whether WZZM could move its tower south from Grant to Hudsonville, some  closer to Battle Creek, thereby eliminating the need for another ABC affiliate in southern West Michigan. The FCC denied the tower move in May 1970 to prevent an "adverse impact on UHF development", another victory for backers of the Battle Creek station.

Channel 41, Inc., received its construction permit on July 31, 1970. From a list of call sign choices, which the station solicited from viewers, the station selected WUHQ-TV, containing a "U" for UHF and "HQ" for headquarters. At that time, the federal government was turning over surplus land in the Fort Custer Military Reservation to the city of Battle Creek, and the city leased the headquarters building to Channel 41, Inc., with an option to buy; the station made $400,000 in improvements to install its studios and offices in the structure. Meanwhile, negotiations with ABC were not concluded until February 1971 because a to-be-built UHF station in Jackson also sought to be an affiliate.

WUHQ-TV began broadcasting on the afternoon of July 24, 1971; in addition to network programs—obtained through a feed from WZZM-TV—and syndicated shows, there were also several planned local programs, including local news coverage. The station's dependence on WZZM-TV instead of direct network service meant that some ABC programs were not seen on channel 41 because they were not seen in Grand Rapids, but it was far cheaper than the monthly cost of a line from AT&T. WUHQ-TV was placed on channel 4 on the Battle Creek cable system, which dropped WZZM-TV from its lineup at that time; the Grand Rapids station was later restored in 1975, then discontinued in 1986 along with two out-of-market network affiliates.

Local newscasts
As WUHQ-TV, channel 41 had an on-again, off-again local news lineup. At launch, the station announced 5:30 and 11 p.m. newscasts to be anchored by radio newsman Roger Thurgaland. However, citing a news department it felt was unprepared, the station switched to airing 5-minute news capsules in the late afternoon and prime time hours; it also added the ABC Evening News to its lineup as both ABC affiliates in the region began to air the program. A 6:30 p.m. evening newscast was later established, but it was scrapped in January 1975 because the owners felt it was too costly and could not adequately compete with the many news programs available on stations broadcast by the local cable system. In 1980, the station brought back a longform evening local newscast in the form of the 15-minute 41 Early Report at 5:45 p.m. This was replaced with a newscast at 6 p.m. in 1982, which was in turn canceled in 1983 to focus efforts on the noon newscast and because of poor ratings against its primary competitor, Kalamazoo station WKZO-TV.

A year later, in September 1984, channel 41 returned to the early evening news fray with a 5:30 p.m. newscast, scrapping the noon news program. A 6 p.m. newscast was added in January 1986; it was organized as the more traditional show, with the 5:30 p.m. half-hour given over to more features and later renamed as 41 Alive with Trudy Yarnell. The 6 p.m. news was then canceled in January 1987: whereas WOTV (channel 8) was viewed by 28 percent of households, WZZM 27 percent and WWMT 18 percent, the WUHQ-TV news offering was attracting just 2 percent of local viewers at that hour. 41 Alive moved to 5:00 before being canceled itself that July, with the local news staff being repurposed as a documentary unit. In January 1987, the station also dropped ABC World News Tonight in favor of reruns of WKRP in Cincinnati, a decision that was not reversed until July 1989.

Without full-length local news, the station focused on cut-ins during Good Morning America, as well as high school football coverage. In February 1991, Diane King, who had joined the station in 1989 to anchor the news cut-ins and be part of the documentary unit, was fatally shot outside her home, having previously told friends that a man had been harassing her. Her husband, Bradford King, was convicted of murder the next year. The murder was profiled on a 2004 episode of Forensic Files.

WZZM merger attempt
In 1990, WZZM owner Northstar Television announced it had entered into a merger agreement with Channel 41, Inc., which would have seen WUHQ-TV and WZZM share almost all programming with the exception of split local news programming. John Lawrence, president of WUHQ, said at the time, "It is now appropriate that ABC service in this market be combined."; he and his brother, William J. Lawrence, Jr., were to become minority stockholders in Northstar as part of the proposed agreement. The FCC approved of the merger in June 1991, with Northstar announcing a plan to continue airing separate news coverage on channel 41 at times when WZZM aired news, but a planned August closing was delayed.

Under WOOD-TV management
Northstar's inability to close the merger agreement led Channel 41, Inc., to pursue another method of bolstering the station's operation. On October 31, 1991, it announced that it had entered into an 11-year local marketing agreement with WOTV (channel 8) to consolidate operations and restore some evening news coverage. Of WOTV's 29 existing employees, 14 were laid off, while four employees were added to produce news inserts for WOTV's 6 and 11 p.m. newscasts. Under the agreement with Channel 41, Inc., WOTV had its own sales, news, and engineering departments by 2001, while WOOD-TV provided programming support and bookkeeping services. WUHQ-TV then changed its call sign to WOTV in June 1992 when WOTV became WOOD-TV, reclaiming a call sign it had been forced to change 20 years prior.

The news inserts on WOTV grew over time, even as ratings remained low. In 1993, what had been an eight- to ten-minute nightly insert grew to 15 minutes at noon, 6, and 11 p.m., with only weather and sports shared with WOOD-TV. This subsequently evolved into full 6 and 11 p.m. newscasts from Battle Creek by 1995, expanding to weekends in 1996. A local morning news program was also added, and extended to an hour in 1999.

In 2001, WOOD-TV owner LIN Television Corporation acquired WOTV outright from Channel 41, Inc., for $2.25 million. It was able to form the duopoly between network affiliates because the station was ranked sixth in the market. The news ratings were equally anemic. In May 2001, Nielsen Media Research figures showed WOOD-TV, WZZM, and WWMT with the top three 6 and 11 p.m. newscasts in West Michigan. WOOD-TV attracted a 25 share—percent of households using TVs—at 6 and 28 percent at 11; WWMT, the primary competitor for Kalamazoo and Battle Creek news, had a 15 share at 6 and 17 at 11. In comparison, WOTV had a 2 share at 6 and a 3 share at 11.

Cancellation of local newscasts

Citing poor ratings and declining market advertising revenues due to the Iraq War, LIN closed the WOTV newsroom on August 21, 2003, and channel 41 began simulcasting four and a half hours a day of newscasts from WOOD-TV. The conversion of WOTV to a Battle Creek/Kalamazoo bureau for WOOD-TV's news operation led to 24 news personnel being laid off, with just four people remaining to provide news coverage to the WOOD-TV newsroom in Grand Rapids alongside 20 sales, engineering, and office staff. The remaining personnel were consolidated to Grand Rapids in 2006, resulting in three further job cuts and the departure of WOTV features reporter Gerry Barnaby. The Fort Custer headquarters building was then donated to a city entity, Battle Creek Unlimited, and later demolished in February 2014.

The 2000s also saw increased coverage overlap between WOTV and WZZM. Satellite television providers Dish Network and DirecTV began offering both stations across the full market in 2002, and WZZM was readded to several Comcast systems in southwest Michigan, including Battle Creek, in 2009. WZZM continued to receive far higher total-day ratings than WOTV in the market; in 2013, channel 13 had an 8.3 percent total-day share compared to channel 41's 1.9 percent. As a result of this ratings imbalance, the station has adopted unusual marketing strategies. In 2012, it rebranded as "WOTV 4 Women" and refocused its talent and local initiatives around the demographic—an unusual case of a station promoting itself specifically to one gender—after having previously branded as "My ABC".

In 2014, LIN was acquired by Media General. Media General was then acquired by Nexstar Broadcasting Group in 2017. When Nexstar then acquired Tribune Media in 2019, Tribune's WXMI, the Fox affiliate in Grand Rapids, was spun out as part of the sale.

Technical information

Subchannels
The station's digital signal is multiplexed:

WOTV is also broadcast in ATSC 3.0 (NextGen TV) on WXSP-CD and WOLP-CD, which converted to the new format in 2021.

Analog-to-digital conversion
WOTV shut down its analog signal, over UHF channel 41, on June 12, 2009, as part of the federally mandated transition from analog to digital television; it continued to broadcast on channel 20, using virtual channel 41. WOTV was then repacked to channel 17 in 2019.

See also
 Channel 4 branded TV stations in the United States
 Channel 20 digital TV stations in the United States
 Channel 41 virtual TV stations in the United States

References

External links
 

ABC network affiliates
Dabl affiliates
Charge! (TV network) affiliates
Television channels and stations established in 1971
1971 establishments in Michigan
OTV
Nexstar Media Group
Battle Creek, Michigan